The Honda K-series engine is a line of four-cylinder four-stroke car engine introduced in 2001. The K-series engines are equipped with DOHC valvetrains and use roller rockers on the cylinder head to reduce friction. The engines use a coil-on-plug, distributorless ignition system with a coil for each spark plug. This system forgoes the use of a conventional distributor-based ignition timing system in favor of a computer-controlled system that allows the ECU to control ignition timings based on various sensor inputs. The cylinders have cast iron sleeves similar to the B- and F-series engines, as opposed to the FRM cylinders found in the H- and newer F-series engines found only in the Honda S2000.

Similar to B series, the K-series car engines have two short blocks with the same design; the only difference between them being the deck height.

Two versions of the Honda i-VTEC system can be found on a K-series engine, and both versions can come with variable timing control (VTC) on the intake cam. The VTEC system on engines like the K20A3 only operate on the intake cam; at low rpm only one intake valve is fully opened, the other opening just slightly to create a swirl effect in the combustion chamber for improved fuel atomization. At high engine speeds, both intake valves open fully to improve engine breathing. In engines such as the K20A2 found in the Acura RSX Type-S, the VTEC system operates on both the intake and exhaust valves, allowing both to benefit from multiple cam profiles. A modified K20C engine is used in motorsport, as the Sports Car Club of America Formula 3 and 4 series that run in North America both use a K20C engine, with the Formula 4 engine not having a turbocharger. These are gaining a following in the import scene, but also among hot rodders and kit car enthusiasts, because they can be put in longitudinal rear wheel drive layouts.

K20

K20A (i-VTEC)

Applications

Additional notes
K20A Spec R engine (FD2 Civic Type R)
Chromoly flywheel, higher-tensile strength connecting rods, high-compression pistons, stiffer valve springs, higher-lift hollow camshafts with more duration, and 2007–2011 cylinder-head intake-port and exhaust-port surface polishing used in NSX-R. The JDM K20A type-R engine block would be removed from production assembly line by an experienced Honda engine technician to torque the connecting rod bolts to factory specification by hand using micrometer to measure connecting rod bolt stretching. Then the JDM K20A type-R engine block would be returned to the production assembly line to complete the engine building process.

K20B (i-VTEC I)

Injection Pressure: 
Center Fuel Injection with swirl guide
Air-Fuel Ratio:
Normal driving cycle: 65:1 (ultra-lean combustion)
Acceleration/High load driving cycle: 14.7:1 (Stoichiometric)
Deep Piston Cavity formed in top of Pistons
Application: 2004–2006 Honda Stream Absolute

K20Z (i-VTEC)

Applications

Additional notes
K20Z3 (as fitted to Ariel's Atom 3.5)
It has an aluminum block with an aluminum head. The K20Z3 has Honda's traditional performance VTEC (as found on previous generation of engines) on the intake and the exhaust cams. Variable cam timing technology is included on the intake but not the exhaust cams. The added timing control corresponds to the added "i" in i-VTEC.

K20C (Earth Dreams VTEC Turbo)

Applications

Additional notes

 Earth Dreams Technology
 K20C1: First Honda Type R engine to be built in the US at the Honda Anna Engine Plant in Anna, Ohio. First time Honda has used a turbocharger on the TYPE R. 
K20C5: All Acura RDX sold in China (manufactured by GAC Acura)
Although the K20C4 in the Acura RDX and the K20C6 in the Acura TLX share the same internals, they are named differently due to different engine mount points to accommodate the sedan body of the TLX. 
The VTEC mechanism is available only on the exhaust valves.

K20C & K20Z (Earth Dreams i-VTEC)

Applications

K23

K23A (i-VTEC Turbo)

Applications

Additional notes
This version of the K engine uses a Mitsubishi TD04HL-15T turbocharger with a dual path turbine housing, optimizing low end response while allowing better high end flow. Maximum boost pressure is 13.5psi. The engine includes i-VTEC and VTC technologies and comes mated to a version of Honda's 5-speed automatic with SH-AWD (note: SH-AWD was standard from 2007-2009 and optional from 2010-2012).

K24

K24A (i-VTEC)

Additional notes
K24A2 and K24A3 (2006-2008 Acura TSX)
Increased intake flow:
 Intake valve + 1 mm oversize (Intake valve head measures 36mm, but valve seat still measures 35mm)
 Intake cam High lift lobe with 0.9 mm more lift and 12 degrees more duration
 Throttle body increased from 60–64 mm
 Radius on some intake pipes increased from 70–80 mm
Increased exhaust flow
 Exhaust Head pipe increased from 60–65 mm
 Higher flow catalytic converter
 Main (single) exhaust pipe increased from 54–57 mm
 Rear (twin) pipes increased in diameter from 42.5 to 45 mm
Block improvements:
 Additional air passages in crankcase for reduced pumping losses
Others
 Stronger connecting rods
 Under-piston oil squirters

K24Z & K24Y (i-VTEC)

Applications

K24W & K24V (Earth Dreams i-VTEC)

Direct Injection, i-VTEC (intake camshaft & valvetrain)

Applications

References

External links
Honda engine pages: i-VTEC DOHC, 2.0L DOHC i-VTEC
K Series VTEC Breakdown: K Series VTEC Breakdown

K
2001 introductions
Straight-four engines
Gasoline engines by model